RGG may refer to:

 Random geometric graph, a concept in mathematical graph theory
 Responsible Government Group (2009), a centre-right caucus in the City Council of Toronto, Canada
 Ryū ga Gotoku, the game series known as Yakuza in the west
 Ryū ga Gotoku, the Japanese title of the first Yakuza game
 Ryu Ga Gotoku Studio, the primary developer of the Yakuza series, among other games